Yasin C is a Turkish bulk carrier, captured by Somali pirates on 7 April 2010 while on its way to Mombasa. The crew locked themselves in the engine room, and the ship was released without ransom on 10 April 2010.

References

Maritime incidents in 2010
Piracy in Somalia
Bulk carriers